Reardon-Hall-Slaney syndrome, also known as mesomelic dwarfism-cleft palate-camptodactyly is a rare genetic disorder which is characterized by mesomelic limb shortening and bowing, finger camptodactyly, skin dimpling, retrognathia and mandibular hypoplasia. Only 2 cases of this syndrome have been described in medical literature, both of those cases being a brother and sister who were born to consanguineous parents. This disorder is inherited in an autosomal recessive fashion.

References 

Autosomal recessive disorders